The  ("Charterhouse of St. Martin") is a former monastery complex, now a museum, in Naples, southern Italy. Along with Castel Sant'Elmo that stands beside it, this is the most visible landmark of the city, perched atop the Vomero hill that commands the gulf. A Carthusian monastery, it was finished and inaugurated under the rule of Queen Joan I in 1368.  It was dedicated to St. Martin of Tours.  During the first half of the 16th century it was expanded.
Later, in 1623, it was further expanded and became, under the direction of architect Cosimo Fanzago, essentially the structure one sees today.

In 1799 anti-clerical French forces of occupation suppressed the monastery and forced the monks to flee. In the ensuing decades the monks made several attempts to reestablish their charter house, with the last effort failing in 1866, when the state definitively confiscated the property. Today, the buildings house the National Museum of San Martino with a display of Spanish and Bourbon era artifacts, as well as displays of the presepe—Nativity scene—considered to be among the finest in the world.

Gallery

References

External links

 

1368 establishments in Europe
14th-century establishments in Italy
Religious buildings and structures completed in 1623
Buildings and structures in Naples
Carthusian monasteries in Italy
Museums in Naples
History museums in Italy
Art museums and galleries in Naples
1623 establishments in Italy